Emma Louise Marie Muscat (born 27 November 1999) is a Maltese singer and model working in Italy. She  represented Malta at the Eurovision Song Contest 2022 in Turin, Italy, with the song "I Am What I Am".

Early life and career 
Emma was born in Malta into a very wealthy family, and approached music from an early age. After compulsory education, she decided to enroll at the University of Performing Arts. As an adolescent she showed her skills in singing, dancing, and in the use of musical instruments: she specialized, in particular, with the piano, she is a classically trained pianist and also started to compose both the music and the text of her songs. 

In 2016 she released her first single "Alone" on her YouTube channel and later in 2017 released her second single "Without You".

In 2018 she participated in the seventeenth edition of the talent show Amici di Maria De Filippi, managing to enter the "evening phase" (fase serale) where she was eliminated in the semi-final, finishing with fourth place in the singing category and a contract with Warner Music Italy. Following her experience at Amici, she participated in "Isle of MTV 2018" with Jason Derulo, Hailee Steinfeld and Sigala and then took part again the following year with Martin Garrix, Bebe Rexha and Ava Max. Later, at Joseph Calleja's yearly concert in Malta, she duetted with the Maltese tenor and Eros Ramazzotti. On 6 July she released her first EP titled Moments, which also featured the two singles previously released only on YouTube. The EP was anticipated by the single "I Need Somebody", released on 2 July. On 7 December the same year, she released her first studio album entitled Moments Christmas Edition with covers of many Christmas classics. On 16 November 2018 she had a duet with rapper Shade in the song Figurati noi.

On 26 April 2019 she released her first single Avec moi, featuring singer Biondo. On 14 November 2019 she participated in the remix of rapper Junior Cally's hit song "Sigarette". On 10 December she released the single "Vicolo Cieco"; after the release of the song, she stated in an interview that it would be the first official extract from her new album. On 3 July 2020 she released her summer single Sangria, with Italian rapper Astol, was certified gold in Italy and reached 28 million streams on YouTube.

Eurovision Song Contest 
The song "Out of Sight" won the contest with a total of 92 points, therefore gaining the right to represent her country at the Eurovision Song Contest 2022 in Turin, Italy. She won the jury's vote as well as the public's. Emma won 12 points from all six members of the Maltese national jury, as well as 20 votes from the public who voted by televoting. On 14 March 2022, a new song was released, titled "I Am What I Am", to replace "Out of Sight" as Muscat's Eurovision entry. I Am What I Am" was performed in the second semi-final of the contest on 12 May 2022, and failed to qualify for the final, finishing in 16th place as Malta’s eighth non-qualification in the contest.

Discography

Studio albums

Extended play

Singles

As lead artist

As featured artist

References 

1999 births
Living people
21st-century Maltese women singers
21st-century Maltese singers
Eurovision Song Contest entrants of 2022
Eurovision Song Contest entrants for Malta